The matrices of concepts are a conceptual tool put forth by philosopher Paul Franceschi, that aim at providing an alternative to the semiotic square described by Algirdas Greimas. To the difference of the semiotic square, a matrix of concepts is made up of 6 concepts, from which two are neutral, two are positive and two are negative. The relationships between the 6 concepts of the same matrix can be stated as follows:
 A0 and Ā0 are dual or inverse; A+ and Ā− are contraries; A− and Ā+ are contraries
 A+ and Ā+ are complementary, in the same way as A− and Ā- 
 A+ and A− are corollary, in the same way as  Ā+ and Ā−
 A0 and A+ are related, in the same way as A0 and A−, Ā0 and Ā+, Ā0 and Ā−

The applications of the matrices of concepts relate to paradigmatic analysis, but also to the dialectical plan, and more generally to the study of concepts.

References 
 Paul Franceschi, English translation of a paper initially published in French under the title Le plan dialectique: pour une alternative au paradigme, Semiotica, vol. 146 (1-4), 2003, pp. 353–367
 Andris Teikmanis, The'use'of'semiotic'modelling as'a'research'tool'of'art'history, Tartu Summer School of Semiotics, August 2011

See also 
 the semiotic square

Semiotics